The Deadliest Disease in America is a 2010 documentary film directed and produced by Crystal R. Emery. The film features commentary from medical and public health experts including Dr. Marcella Nunez-Smith, Dr. Camara Jones, Dr. Harlan Krumholz and Dr. Amelie G. Ramirez. This documentary reveals the history of racism in American healthcare and brutal scientific experiments done by using African slaves. It also explained the Black and Brown inequalities and biases continue to plague.

The film has been shot New Haven, Connecticut, USA. It took 10 years to complete the documentary. The film made its premier on 27 January 2010. The film received positive reviews from critics. The film was again screened at New York City’s Cinema Village on September 10 and running through September 16, 2021.

Cast
 William Chapin, PT 
 Dr. Amelie G. Ramirez, P.H. 
 Dr. Harlan Krumholz  
 Dr. Marcella Nunez-Smith 
 Elisabeth Krause 
 Dr. Bert Petersen 
 Anna Novais 
 Durrell J. Fox 
 Dr. Camara Jones

References

External links 
 

American documentary films
2010 films
2010 documentary films
2010s American films